Bas Peters (born 14 May 1976 in Heel, Limburg) is a Dutch cyclist specializing in competitive mountain biking. Peters represented the Netherlands at the 2004 Summer Olympics in Athens where he finished in 13th position where his teammate Bart Brentjens won the bronze medal.

See also
 List of Dutch Olympic cyclists

References

External links
Peters at the Dutch Olympic Archive

1976 births
Living people
Dutch male cyclists
Dutch mountain bikers
Cross-country mountain bikers
Cyclists at the 2004 Summer Olympics
Olympic cyclists of the Netherlands
People from Maasgouw
Cyclists from Limburg (Netherlands)